The Infante Dom Henrique Bridge, commonly known as Infante Bridge, is a road bridge across the Douro River in Greater Porto, Portugal.  The bridge is upriver from the Dom Luís I Bridge and downriver from the Maria Pia Bridge.

Completed in 2003, the Infante Bridge carries vehicle and pedestrian traffic from Vila Nova de Gaia to Central Porto.  The bridge was constructed as a replacement for the upper deck of the Dom Luís I Bridge that was closed to vehicle traffic in 2003 to allow for its conversion to the D Line of the Porto Metro.

Inspired by the alpine Maillart bridges, the Infante Bridge's arch is one of the shallowest in the world as a ratio of rise from base over length.

References

Tourist attractions in Porto
Bridges in Porto
Transport infrastructure in Porto
Bridges in Porto District